The discography of the British singer Ian McCulloch consists of four studio albums, one compilation album, and nine singles. While he was still the lead singer of the band Echo & the Bunnymen, McCulloch released his debut solo single, a version of the standard "September Song", in 1984 which reached number fifty-one on the UK Singles Chart.

McCulloch left Echo & the Bunnymen in 1988 and released his debut solo album, Candleland (1989), which reached number eighteen on the UK Albums Chart. Three singles from the album – "Proud to Fall", "Faith and Healing" and "Candleland (The Second Coming)", which features Elizabeth Fraser of the Cocteau Twins – were released, but did not chart well in the UK. However, "Proud to Fall" reached number one on Billboard magazine's Modern Rock Tracks chart in the United States, while "Faith and Healing" reached number ten on the same chart. Mysterio was released in 1992, reaching number forty-six on the UK Albums Chart. Of the supporting singles – "Honeydrip", "Lover Lover Lover" and "Dug for Love" – only "Lover Lover Lover" (a Leonard Cohen cover) reached the British charts at number forty-six.

In 1993, McCulloch contributed vocals to the track "Moses", on 808 State'''s album, Gorgeous.

After a brief spell recording as Electrafixion with former Echo & the Bunnymen guitarist Will Sergeant, the pair reformed Echo & the Bunnymen in 1997. While still with the band, McCulloch released a further solo album, Slideling, in 2002. The album failed to chart and, of the two singles released from the album, "Sliding" and "Love in Veins", only "Sliding" reached the UK Singles Chart when it reached number sixty-one. In May 2012, McCulloch released his fan-funded fourth studio album, Pro Patria Mori, via website, PledgeMusic.

Studio albums

Compilation albums

Other album appearances

Singles

Other charted songs

Music videos

See also
Echo & the Bunnymen discography

References

General
Strong, M. C. (editor) (1998) [1994]. The Great Rock Discography'' (4th edition). Florence, Italy: Giunti. p. 234. .

Specific

External links

Discographies of British artists
Rock music discographies